Niels Verburgh (born 31 January 1998) is a Belgian professional footballer who plays for Luxembourger club Jeunesse Esch. He represented Belgium at youth international level.

Club career
On 23 June 2021, he joined Jeunesse Esch in Luxembourg.

References

External links
 

1998 births
Footballers from Bruges
Living people
Belgian footballers
Belgium youth international footballers
Association football midfielders
Club Brugge KV players
S.K. Beveren players
Roda JC Kerkrade players
K.S.V. Roeselare players
Jeunesse Esch players
Belgian Pro League players
Eerste Divisie players
Luxembourg National Division players
Belgian expatriate footballers
Expatriate footballers in the Netherlands
Belgian expatriate sportspeople in the Netherlands
Expatriate footballers in Luxembourg
Belgian expatriate sportspeople in Luxembourg